Arthouse Entertainment is a Los Angeles-based music publishing and production company founded by Kara DioGuardi and Stephen Finfer.  Arthouse represents a roster of songwriters, producers and artists.

Hit Songs
Arthouse songs have been released on over 150 million hit records. Songs such as "Grenade" "Just the Way You Are" "The Lazy Song" and "Marry You" (Bruno Mars), "Club Can't Handle Me" (Flo Rida), "Undo It" and "Mama's Song" (Carrie Underwood), "Lighters" (Bad Meets Evil) "Young Wild & Free" (Snoop Dogg) and (Wiz Khalifa) "Never Close Our Eyes" (Adam Lambert) "Great Big Love" (Rascal Flatts) "Postcards from Paris" (The Band Perry)  “Walk Away (Kelly Clarkson) “Come Clean” (Hilary Duff), “Gangsta Nation” (Westside Connection) and “What’s Left of Me” (Nick Lachey), multi-platform singles such as “Me & U” (Cassie) and “We Fly High” (Jim Jones), and cross-genre hits like “Rich Girl” (Gwen Stefani), “Holy Water” (Big & Rich) and “(I Got that) Boom Boom” (Britney Spears) helped Arthouse climb the ranks as an independent music publisher worldwide.

Music Chart Rankings
Arthouse has been represented on the Billboard Top Ten albums chart with songs and productions on Bruno Mars (Doowops & Hooligans), Cee-Lo (The Lady Killer), Carrie Underwood (Play On), The Band Perry (The Band Perry), Britney Spears (Circus), Pink    (Funhouse), Katy Perry (One of the Boys), Sugarland (Love on the Inside), Hannah Montana/Miley Cyrus (Hannah Montana 2: Meet Miley Cyrus), and David Archuleta's self-titled debut.

Awards
Arthouse writers have been recipients of BMI & ASCAP Awards, including:  Zukhan Bey's “We Fly High” (Jim Jones), Kasia Livingston's “Stickwitu” (The Pussycat Dolls), Emanuel Kiriakou's “What’s Left of Me” (Nick Lachey), Ryan Leslie's “Me & U” (Cassie), and in addition to earning 11 BMI Pop Awards, Kara DioGuardi was named BMI Songwriter of the Year.  The Grammy foundation nominated Arthouse writer/producers, such as Mitch Allan & Kara DioGuardi for Belinda (“Bella Traicion” as Song of the Year), James Poyser for Al Green (Lay it Down as Best R&B Album), and Greg Wells for Mika (“Love Today” as Best Dance Recording).

Featured Placements
Arthouse songs have been featured in major campaigns nationwide, including brands such as 
Chrysler, 
Pepsi, 
Elizabeth Arden, 
Dell, 
Doritos, 
Candies and Bally's.  
Arthouse songs have also been licensed in film and television productions, for studios such as 
Disney, 
Warner Bros Pictures, 
20th Century Studios, 
Universal Pictures, 
Sony Pictures, 
New Line Cinemas, 
Paramount Pictures, 
and Lions Gate Entertainment; as well as 
NBC, 
ABC, 
CBS, 
MTV, 
VH1, 
BET, 
HBO, 
Lifetime, Bravo and the CW.

External links
 Arthouse Official Website
 Kara DioGuardi Official Website

Music publishing companies of the United States